Dmytrivka is a village in Izmail Raion, Odesa Oblast, Ukraine. It belongs to Kiliia urban hromada, one of the hromadas of Ukraine.

History
About 600 Jews (supposedly from Odessa) were executed by Romanian gendarmerie on March 3, 1942.

Until 18 July 2020, Dmytrivka belonged to Kiliia Raion. The raion was abolished in July 2020 as part of the administrative reform of Ukraine, which reduced the number of raions of Odesa Oblast to seven. The area of Kiliia Raion was merged into Izmail Raion.

References

Villages in Izmail Raion
Romanian communities in Ukraine
Holocaust locations in Ukraine